K. C. Veeramani is the former Member of the Legislative Assembly from Jolarpet assembly constituency in Tirupattur district, Tamil Nadu. He was elected as a representative of the All India Anna Dravida Munnetra Kazhagam party in 2011 and again in the elections of 2016.

He was the Minister of Commercial Taxes and Registration Departments of Tamil Nadu. He is a former Minister For School Education and earlier served as the Health and Welfare minister for Tamil Nadu in 2011–16.

References

Tamil Nadu politicians
People from Vellore district
Living people
All India Anna Dravida Munnetra Kazhagam politicians
Tamil Nadu MLAs 2011–2016
Tamil Nadu ministers
1964 births
Tamil Nadu MLAs 2016–2021